Zahl is a surname. Notable people with the surname include:

 Zahl (Norwegian family)
 Cato Zahl Pedersen (born 1959), a Norwegian skier
 Erasmus Zahl (1826–1900), a Norwegian tradesman and supporter of Knut Hamsun
 Geir Zahl (born 1975), a Norwegian musician
 Harold A. Zahl (1905–1983), an American physicist